"Bang That" is a song by British electronic music duo Disclosure. It features the vocals sampled from 313 Bass Mechanincs' song "Pass Out". It was released worldwide on 1 May 2015 as a promotional single. The song appears on the deluxe version of the duo's second studio album, Caracal. The track was written by Guy Lawrence, Howard Lawrence and Julian Shamou.

Track listing

Charts

Release history

References

2015 singles
2015 songs
Disclosure (band) songs
Island Records singles
Songs written by Guy Lawrence
Songs written by Howard Lawrence